A Daughter's Tale Pankh is an Bollywood action-drama film directed by and produced by Rajinder Verma. Directed by Premraaj & Rajinder Verma  under the banner of Yash babu Entertainment. It has generally received positive reviews from critics. The principal locations of the shoot were Mumbai, Delhi, Kurukshetra and Haryana. The production was done under the guidance of IAS of Kurukshetra, Mrs. Sumedha Kataria, and Special Correspondent of The Pioneer, Mr. Sourabh Chowdhury. The story and screenplay are written by Rajinder Verma. It features actor Dr. Nishigandha Wad, Mehul Buch, Sudhir Pandey, Surbhi Kakkar, Amarjeet Singh, Vipin Goyal, Sonam Arora & Ayush Shah. Music of the film was composed by Mahesh.

Cast
Nishigandha Wad
Mehul Buch 
Sudhir Pandey
Virendra Singh
Surbhi Kakkar
Ragini Dixit
Pooja Dixit
Paruk Kaushik
Sonam Arora
Aakash sharma
Rahul Jaittly
Sunil Lahri
Amarjeet Singh Tumber
Chunar Verma
Sourabh Chowdhury 
Gayatri Kaushal
Sumedha Kataria
Premraaj
Ayush Shah
Rahuul Chuwdhary
Sunil Kumar Tinna
Vipin Pandey
Sadiq Abbas rizvi

References

External links

A Daughter's Tale Pankh on The A.V. Club
A Daughter's Tale Pankh on Bollywood Hungama

2010s Hindi-language films
Indian action drama films
2017 action drama films